Stanley Julian Roszkowski (January 27, 1923 – July 7, 2014) was a United States district judge of the United States District Court for the Northern District of Illinois.

Education and career

Born in Boonville, New York, Roszkowski was a Staff Sergeant in the United States Army Air Forces during World War II, from 1943 to 1945. He received a Bachelor of Science degree from the University of Illinois at Urbana–Champaign in 1949 and a Juris Doctor from the University of Illinois College of Law in 1954. He was in private practice in Rockford, Illinois from 1955 to 1977.

Federal judicial service

On July 19, 1977, Roszkowski was nominated by President Jimmy Carter to a seat on the United States District Court for the Northern District of Illinois vacated by Judge Richard Wellington McLaren. Roszkowski was confirmed by the United States Senate on October 7, 1977, and received his commission on October 11, 1977. He assumed senior status on January 9, 1991, serving in that capacity until his retirement, on January 31, 1998. The Stanley J. Roszkowski United States Courthouse in Rockford is named for him. He died in Rockford, on July 7, 2014.

References

Sources
 

1923 births
2014 deaths
People from Rockford, Illinois
People from Boonville, New York
University of Illinois Urbana-Champaign alumni
University of Illinois College of Law alumni
Judges of the United States District Court for the Northern District of Illinois
United States district court judges appointed by Jimmy Carter
20th-century American judges
United States Army Air Forces soldiers
United States Army Air Forces personnel of World War II